Colin Mackay (26 July 1951 – 28 July 2003) was a poet and novelist. His final work was an autobiography entitled Jacob's Ladder which included talking about his planned suicide.

Books
 The Sound of the Sea (1990) 
 The Song of the Forest: A Fable of Magical Scotland (1986) 
 Cold Night Lullaby (1998) 
 House of Lies (1998) 
 Fires in the Night 
 Howling at the Moon

References

External links
Author biography
Colin Mackay: Literary witness to the catastrophes of war 
https://web.archive.org/web/20050502231654/http://www.sundayherald.com/39773 (broken)

1951 births
2003 suicides
20th-century British poets